Selja Kumari (born 24 September 1962) is an Indian politician and former parliamentarian. A member of the Indian National Congress, she has been the Minister of Social Justice and Empowerment and Tourism in the Government of India during Manmohan Singh's premiership.

Selja was first elected to the Lok Sabha in 1991 from Sirsa, a constituency that she retained in the 1996 elections. Following her election to the 15th Lok Sabha from Ambala, she was appointed the Minister of Social Justice and Empowerment. It was during this period that Selja worked to furthering the cause of women's rights as well as the rights of marginalised communities in India.

Selja unsuccessfully contested the general elections in 2019 from Ambala, and following that made a return to state politics, being elected the president of the Haryana unit of the Congress party later that year. She was a member of the Rajya Sabha from 2014 to 2020.

Early life
Selja Kumari was born on 24 September 1962 in Parbhuwala Hisar to Chaudhary Dalbir Singh, who was a politician from the Indian National Congress. She studied at the Convent of Jesus and Mary, New Delhi and later attended the Panjab University, where she completed master's and an  postgraduate degree.

Political career

Early career and electoral debut (1990–2003)
Selja began her political career in the Mahila Congress becoming its President in 1990. She was elected to the 10th Lok Sabha in 1991 from Sirsa in Haryana. She was Union Minister of State for Education and Culture in the Narasimha Rao-led Congress government. Despite the Congress debacle in Haryana in 1996, she was re-elected to the 11th Lok Sabha.

Selja began actively participating in international conferences and summits following her election to the 14th Lok Sabha in 2004. She was elected as a member of the Governing Board of Commonwealth Local Government Forum in 2005. She continued to engage with other such organisations as the Commonwealth Parliamentary Association and also headed the Commonwealth Consultative Group on Human Settlements.

Role under UPA governments (2004–2013)

Selja also took the oath as the Union Minister of State (Independent Charge) for Housing and Urban Poverty Alleviation in the Manmohan Singh-led government that following the 2004 electoral victory.

Following her election to the 15th Lok Sabha from Ambala, Selja was appointed the Minister of Tourism in Manmohan Singh's second cabinet. She visited such countries as Italy and Cyprus aimed at improving international relations during her time in office.

In March 2011, Selja was issued notices by the Punjab and Haryana High Court over a petition that has accused her of "forgery, criminal intimidation, fabrication and hatching a criminal conspiracy".
The petitioner, advocate B S Chahar, has alleged that Selja, who was "instrumental in instigating leaders and members of the Balmiki community against Jat leaders in Mirchpur case", tried to save herself from a litigation by pressurising the undertrials and forcing them to sign "blank and non judicial papers".

Selja later took oath as Minister of Social Justice and Empowerment in 2012. She remained in office for five years until the completion of her term in May 2014, a period during which she worked on issues relating to empowerment of women and rights of marginalised communities.

Move to Rajya Sabha and beyond (2014–present)
Selja was elected to the Rajya Sabha, the upper house of the Parliament of India, from her home state of Haryana in 2014. She unsuccessfully contested the 2019 Indian general elections from Ambala, losing out to Bhartiya Janata Party's Rattan Lal Kataria. Following that, she expressed a renewed interest in the politics of the state and was appointed the president of the Haryana Pradesh Congress Committee in September, 2019, just ahead of the assembly elections scheduled for October.

References

External links

 Official biographical sketch in Parliament of India website

|-

|-

|-

|-

1962 births
Living people
Indian National Congress politicians from Haryana
India MPs 1991–1996
India MPs 1996–1997
India MPs 2004–2009
India MPs 2009–2014
Rajya Sabha members from Haryana
People from Hisar (city)
People from Ambala
Union ministers of state of India with independent charge
Members of the Cabinet of India
Lok Sabha members from Haryana
Women in Haryana politics
21st-century Indian women politicians
21st-century Indian politicians
20th-century Indian women politicians
20th-century Indian politicians
Women members of the Cabinet of India
Women members of the Rajya Sabha
Culture Ministers of India
Women members of the Lok Sabha